Lekarstvenny is a rural locality (a settlement) in Rogachyovskoye Rural Settlement, Novousmansky District, Voronezh Oblast, Russia. The population was 323 as of 2010.

Geography 
Lekarstvenny is located 24 km southeast of Novaya Usman (the district's administrative centre) by road. Rogachyovka is the nearest rural locality.

References 

Rural localities in Novousmansky District